Richard Joseph Howard (October 13, 1929 – March 31, 2022; adopted as Richard Joseph Orwitz) was an American poet, literary critic, essayist, teacher, and translator.  He was born in Cleveland, Ohio, and was a graduate of Columbia University, where he studied under Mark Van Doren, and where he was an emeritus professor.  He lived in New York City.

Life
After reading French letters at the Sorbonne in 1952–53, Howard had a brief early career as a lexicographer.  He soon turned his attention to poetry and poetic criticism, and won the Pulitzer Prize for poetry for his 1969 collection Untitled Subjects, which took for its subject dramatic imagined letters and monologues of 19th century historical figures.  For much of his career, Howard composed poems employing a quantitative verse technique.

A prolific literary critic, Howard's monumental 1969 volume Alone With America stretches to 594 pages and profiles 41 American poets who had published at least two books each and "have come into a characteristic and—as I see it—consequential identity since the time, say, of the Korean War." Howard would later tell an interviewer I wrote the book not for the sense of history, but for myself, knowing that a relation to one's moment was essential to getting beyond the moment. As I quoted Shaw in the book's preface, if you cannot believe in the greatness of your own age and inheritance, you will fall into confusion of mind and contrariety of spirit. The book was a rescuing anatomy of such belief, the construction of a credendum—articles of faith, or at least appreciation.

He was awarded the PEN Translation Prize in 1976 for his translation of E. M. Cioran's A Short History of Decay and the National Book Award 
for his 1983 translation of Baudelaire's Les Fleurs du mal. Howard was a long-time poetry editor of The Paris Review. He received a Pulitzer prize, the Academy of Arts and Letters Literary Award and a MacArthur Fellowship. In 1985, Howard received the PEN/Ralph Manheim Medal for Translation. A past Chancellor of the Academy of American Poets, he was Professor of Practice in the writing program at Columbia's School of the Arts.  He was previously University Professor of English at the University of Houston and, before that, Ropes Professor of Comparative Literature at the University of Cincinnati.  He served as Poet Laureate of the State of New York from 1993 to 1995.

In 1982, Howard was named a Chevalier of L'Ordre National du Mérite by the government of France.

In 2016, he received the Philolexian Society Award for Distinguished Literary Achievement.

Howard died in New York City on March 31, 2022, from complications of dementia.

Personal life 

Richard Howard was born to poor Jewish parents. His last name at birth is unknown. He was adopted as an infant by Emma Joseph and Harry Orwitz, a middle-class Cleveland couple, who were also Jewish; his mother changed their last names to "Howard" when he was an infant, after she divorced Orwitz.  Howard never met his birth parents, nor his sister, who was adopted by another local family. Howard was gay, a fact that comes up frequently in his later work. He was out to some degree since at least the 1960s, when he remarked to friend W. H. Auden that he was offended by a fellow poet's use of Jewish and gay epithets, "since [he was] both these things", to which Auden replied, "My dear, I never knew you were Jewish!"

Howard kept on his bed in a nook of his New York City apartment a large stuffed gorilla named "Mildred".

Works

Poetry
 Quantities (1962)
 Damages (1967)
 Untitled Subjects (1969)
 Findings (1971)
 Two-Part Inventions (1974)
 Fellow Feelings (1976)
 Misgivings (1979)
 Lining Up (1984)
 No Traveller (1989)
 Selected Poems (1991)
 Like Most Revelations (1994)
 Trappings (1999)
 Talking Cures (2002)
 Fallacies of Wonder (2003)
 Inner Voices (selected poems), 2004
 The Silent Treatment (2005)
 Without Saying (2008)
 A Progressive Education (2014)

Critical essays

 Alone With America: Essays on the Art of Poetry in the United States Since 1950 (1969)
 Preferences: 51 American Poets Choose Poems From Their Own Work and From the Past (1974)
 Travel Writing of Henry James (essay) (1994)
 Paper Trail: Selected Prose 1965–2003 (2004)

Major translations (French to English)
 The Traitor by André Gorz
 Les Fleurs du mal by Charles Baudelaire
 Camera Lucida by Roland Barthes and other works, such as Mythologies and Mourning Diary
Force of Circumstance by Simone de Beauvoir
 Nadja by André Breton
Mobile by Michel Butor and other works
 A Happy Death by Albert Camus
 The Trouble with Being Born by Emil Cioran and other works
Proust and Signs by Gilles Deleuze
William Marshal: The Flower of Chivalry by Georges Duby
 Madness and Civilization by Michel Foucault and other works
 The War Memoirs (Unity and Salvation) by Charles de Gaulle
 The Immoralist by André Gide and other works
 Lying Woman by Jean Giraudoux
 The Opposing Shore by Julien Gracq and other works
 Nedjma by Kateb Yacine
 Hothouses by Maurice Maeterlinck
 The Stars by Edgar Morin
 The History of Surrealism by Maurice Nadeau
 Jealousy by Alain Robbe-Grillet and other works
Cupid’s Executioners by Hubert Monteilhet and other works
 La Guerre en Algérie by Jules Roy
 The Little Prince by Antoine de Saint-Exupéry
 Nausea by Jean-Paul Sartre
 The Flanders Road by Claude Simon and other works
 The Charterhouse of Parma by Stendhal
 Paris in the Twentieth Century by Jules Verne

References

External links
Richard Howard's biography in poets.org
 
The poem "Only Different" at Guernica
The poem "Richard, What's That Noise?" at The Poetry Foundation
 

1929 births
2022 deaths
American male poets
Jewish American poets
Poets Laureate of New York (state)
American LGBT poets
American gay writers
American literary critics
American lexicographers
French–English translators
Pulitzer Prize for Poetry winners
National Book Award winners
Lambda Literary Award for Gay Poetry winners
MacArthur Fellows
Members of the American Academy of Arts and Letters
Knights of the Ordre national du Mérite
Columbia University faculty
University of Houston faculty
Columbia College (New York) alumni
University of Paris alumni
LGBT Jews
LGBT people from Ohio
20th-century American poets
21st-century American poets
American adoptees
Writers from Cleveland
Poets from Ohio
20th-century translators
20th-century American male writers
21st-century American male writers
21st-century American non-fiction writers
American male non-fiction writers
21st-century American Jews
Gay poets